Nogal is a census-designated place and unincorporated community in Lincoln County, New Mexico, United States. Its population was 96 as of the 2010 census. Nogal has a post office with ZIP code 88341, which opened on November 9, 1880.

Geography
Nogal is in southwestern Lincoln County, in the valley of Nogal Creek at the north end of the Sierra Blanca range. New Mexico State Road 37 passes through the community, leading northwest  to Carrizozo, the county seat, and south  to Ruidoso, the largest community in the county.

Demographics

Education
Carrizozo Municipal Schools is the local school district.

References

Census-designated places in New Mexico
Unincorporated communities in Lincoln County, New Mexico
Census-designated places in Lincoln County, New Mexico
Unincorporated communities in New Mexico